Thomas Bainbrigge Fletcher (25 March 1878 – 30 April 1950) was an English entomologist. Although an amateur lepidopterist who worked in the Royal Navy, he became an expert on "microlepidoptera" and was appointed as the second Imperial Entomologist in India to succeed Harold Maxwell Lefroy. Although only an amateur entomologist, he is credited with reorganizing entomological research in India by coordinating and directing research, efficient sharing of findings and a reduction in duplication of research work.

Fletcher's father William Bainbrigge Fletcher was a fleet surgeon in the Royal Navy (retired 1890). Thomas became a naval paymaster until he retired in 1915. While in the navy, he joined the Percy Sladen Trust Expedition to the Indian Ocean and was appointed Imperial Entomologist in India, succeeding Harold Maxwell-Lefroy at the Imperial Agricultural Research Institute at Pusa. Although lacking academic qualifications in entomology, he was a meticulous naturalist and very careful on matters of systematics and taxonomic nomenclature. His work as head of entomological research in India was initially on identifying work that had already been done and that which was ongoing. By conducting meetings of researchers he ensured that duplication was avoided. 

At the third entomological meeting in 1919 he made a call for a boycott of German tools and a call to ignore German publications from 1914 citing a practice called for by Sir George Hampson.

He produced a List of Publications On Indian Entomology and a Catalogue of Indian Insects. He also worked out the life-histories of many moth species in the families Gelechidae, Cosmopterygidae, Neopseutidae and Tortricidae and produced A List of Generic Names used for Microlepidoptera (1929). He also wrote several more general works on entomology including Some South Indian Insects (1914), Tentative Keys to the Orders and families of Indian insects (1926), A Veterinary Entomology for India and Hints On Collecting and Preserving Insects. His knowledge of classical Greek, Latin and French and a popular style of writing also allowed him to write for lay audiences. His book Birds of an Indian Garden with Charles M. Inglis was meant for non-specialist readers.
Fletcher was a fellow of the Linnean Society, the Royal Entomological Society, Zoological Society of London and a president of the Cotteswold Naturalists' Field Club. He married Esme Violet Hollingbery at Saidpur, Uttar Pradesh, on 17 February 1917. His wife left India and was hospitalized in London for many years and in 1947, he suffered from a stroke that left him partly paralysed on the right side. He donated the bulk of Rodborough Common in Gloucestershire to the National Trust in 1937 (after the National Trust declined an earlier offer in 1935). In 1949 he filed for bankruptcy but his assets were valued at £4762, enough to pay off his debts of £1119.

His position as Imperial Entomologist was succeeded by Hem Singh Pruthi.

Species named after him include:
 Basilia fletcheri

Publications
 Fletcher, T. B. (1926). Tentative Keys to the Orders and Families of Indian Insects. Bull. Agric. Res. Inst. Pusa, No. 162,
Fletcher, T. B. and C. M. Inglis (1924). Birds of an Indian Garden. Calcutta & Simla: Thacker, Spink & Co.
 Fletcher, T. B. (1914). Some South Indian Insects. By Superintendent Government Press, Madras.
 ———— (1910). "The Orneodidae and Pterophoridae of the Seychelles Expedition". Transactions of the Linnean Society of London. 13: 397-403.
 ———— (1920). Life-Histories of Indian Insects: Microlepidoptera. Pterophoridae
 ———— (1933). Life Histories of Indian Microlepidoptera. Scientific Monograph No.4: 1-169. 
 ———— (1916). "One Hundred Notes On Indian Insects". Bulletin No. 59. Agricultural Research Institute, Pusa.

References

External links

 "Fletcher, Thomas Bainbrigge (1878-1950) Entomologist". The National Archives.
 Birds of an Indian garden (with C.M. Inglis, 1924)

1878 births
1950 deaths
English lepidopterists
Royal Navy logistics officers